Mounira Harbi-Riahi is a Tunisian archeologist and historian, best known for her writings on the prehistory of Tunisia, in her encyclopaedic book series Atlas préhistorique de la Tunisie (1985–present).

References 

Living people
20th-century Tunisian historians
21st-century Tunisian historians
Year of birth missing (living people)
Tunisian archaeologists